Urban Breeze (released 2003 in Oslo, Norway by Tylden & Co – GTACD 8223) is an album by the Norwegian jazz band The Swing Pack.

Review 
Norwegian depth look at the great American songbook has a tendency to end with awkward copies, but this is a shining exception by the sextet The Swing Pack, formerly known as The Sinatra Songbook. With a solid jazz ensemble at all seats they are swinging gracefully through a set of American standards and not to mention a handful of style secure songs from their own production, and fixes both the feather ease and distinct request, as this music requires to work.

The singer Ingar Kristiansen appear as slightly less Sinatra and a little more Kristiansen than on the previous record, which is entirely positive. The album will also offer several brilliant instrumental solos and three great sounding recordings with the Radio Orchestra in impeccable shape.

The review in the Norwegian newspaper Dagbladet awarded the album a perfect score of five dice.

Track listing 
«Hangin' On To A Lover's Dream» (3:50)
«The Most Beautiful Of All» (5:14)
«I Wish I Were In Love Again» (6:01)
«Playing Her Game» (4:32)
«My Heart Stood Still» (2:49)
«Darn That Dream» (4:39)
«Wizard Of Love» (4:15)
«It Never Entered My Mind» (3:05)
«Witchcraft» (5:03)
«(Love Is) The Tender Trap» (2:30)
«Guess I'll Hang My Tears Out To Dry» (3:40)
«I Thought About You» (4:01)

Personnel 
Ingar Kristiansen - vocals
Eckhard Baur - trumpet
Odd André Elveland - tenor saxophone
Anders Aarum - piano
Jens Fossum - double bass
Torstein Ellingsen - drums

Credits 
Design & photography – Tommy Løland
Executive producer – Torstein Ellingsen
Executive producer – Ingar Kristiansen
Mastered by – Fridtjof A. Lindeman
Photography – Ole Musken
Recorded & mixed by – Vidar Lunden

Notes 
Orchestra – Norwegian Radio Orchestra (tracks: 10-12)

References 

Jazz albums by Norwegian artists
2003 albums